Ancient Cypriot art refers to all works of visual art originating from Cyprus in the Eastern Mediterranean from c. 10,000 BC to c. 330 AD. During this period, various types of objects were produced such as domestic tools, weaponry, jewellery, and decorative figurines. This range of art attests to the blend of both native and foreign influences of ancient Egypt, Greece and Rome as they successively occupied the country. Artworks produced in ancient Cyprus incorporate almost all of the mediums of visual art worked on in ancient history including terracotta, stone, metals, glass, and gemstones.

Prehistoric Period (c. 10,000 - c. 1050 BC)

Pre-Neolithic (c. 10,000 - c. 8500 BC) and Neolithic (c. 8500 - c. 3900 BC) Periods 
In c. 10,000 BC, seasonal hunters of pygmy hippopotami and elephants were present on the island. The first Neolithic settlers in Cyprus originated from either the Syro-Palestinian coast or southern Anatolia, forming communities founded on agriculture. It was towards the end of the Neolithic period when people began to bake moulded clay into vessels which were frequently embellished with abstract designs in red on a light slip.

Chalcolithic Period (c. 3900 - c. 2500 BC) 
During this period, a new flood of Syro-Palestinian and Anatolian migrants introduced a more advanced culture where religion was practised and art processes became more complex. Examples of such art are that of female figurines formed from clay or stone—in particular the local stone picrolite—with prominent genitals which represented fertility as one of the crucial values of agrarian society at the time. Towards the end of this period, small implements and ornamental decorations began to be hammered from copper,  in Greek, hence giving the name of this era of progression from the Neolithic Period to the Bronze Age. Despite the continuation of agriculture, certain developments such as diversified burial procedures, the building of unique religious installations, and the use of seals indicate a more sophisticated and organised society.

Early Bronze Age (c. 2500 - c. 1900 BC) 
Profound changes caused by incoming coastal Asia Minor migrants and other intra-societal processes marked the beginning of the Early Bronze Age. Communities began to move, settling in areas of fertile land near sources of water. Influences from the Near East, where metallurgy was highly developed, established standardised procedures of mining, extracting, and smelting of the rich copper ores found in Cyprus. This resource would become a valued export of high demand throughout Mediterranean antiquity during the Middle Bronze Age. Although Cypriot society was still rooted in agriculture, bronze-smiths began to manufacture unique ornaments and tools following personal techniques towards the end of Early Bronze Age.

Middle Bronze Age (c. 1900 - c. 1650 BC) 
The distinctive geographical location of Cyprus in the centre of Eastern Mediterranean maritime trade allowed for the country to become a significant commercial hub. This advantage also provided the country the ability to build contacts with Egypt, the Near East, Minoan Crete, and Mycenaean Greece. However, despite progressive social organisation, the profound distinctions in wealth as evidenced in burials highlight the explicit social divisions at the time. Such divide and local disputes resulted in the construction of fortifications in many settlements.

The shapes and designs of pottery produced in the Early and Middle Bronze Ages were innovative and creative. Terracotta was used extensively to produce statuettes for tomb burials. Other burial items, particularly those for men, consisted of bronze weaponry and tools. Cylinder seals and use of gold and silver for jewellery were gradually popularised as well. With the increasing need for more complex ways of expressing religion, ceremonial sites and unique metalworks were constructed. Such constructions give evidence of the growing significance of metals like copper in Cyprus. By the end of the Bronze Age, Near Eastern and Aegean influences allowed for Cyprus to develop the art of engraving and carving to a large extent.

Late Bronze Age (c. 1650 - c. 1050 BC) 

During the Late Bronze Age, Cyprus was producing copper on a colossal scale and exporting it throughout the entire Eastern Mediterranean to be bartered for commodities and luxury goods. Various works of alabaster and faience, displayed within The Cesnola Collection, were imported from Egypt during the first half of the 14th century BC. The recent archaeological discovery off the Anatolian coast of ten tonnes of copper in a 14th-century BC shipwreck at Ulu Burun show the large scope of Cyprus’ seafaring commerce. Jars holding Cypriot pottery and products of agriculture such as coriander were also found in the excavation.

By the Late Bronze Age, Cypriot art could be seen as a mixture of both domestic pressures and foreign influences. Adaptations of foreign stylistic elements from the Aegean, the Near East, and Egypt led to their reinterpretation and as a result incorporation into unique Cypriot customs. Particularly during the 12th century BC, bronze-work, writing, jewellery, and stone seal carvings were all influenced by the Aegean. From c. 1500 BC, Cypriots commenced using an undecipherable Cypro-Minoan script adopted from Crete which gave them the means to manage records and inventories at a time when social organisation was becoming increasingly complex. This script can be seen on clay tablets and records found in metropolitan cities such as Enkomi and Kalavasos. The Cesnola Collection also contains numerous vases on which some characters of this ancient script is visible. Upon excavations of rich burial grounds and 14th to 13th century BC urban centres like Enkomi, luxurious artefacts made from a range of materials have been discovered. Burial chambers of an elite class have further unearthed nearly exclusively a collection of imported Mycenaean vessels from the 14th century.

While the arts in Cyprus thrived, social inequities arose as a result of the flux of imported wealth and resources. During the latter part of the 13th century BC, unrest took over Cyprus and the Eastern Mediterranean, leaving cities in ruins and generating a surge of Aegean refugees to Cyprus. However, despite the turmoil, Cyprus managed to eventually recover its economic and commercial success.

Cypro-Geometric Period (c. 1050 - c. 750 BC) 
After its recuperation, new settlements arose in Cyprus as a result of the influx of Greek and Achaean immigrants who brought with them their Mycenaean culture in the forms of pottery, clothing, weaponry, burial customs, and the Greek language. The country maintained its role as a main exporter of raw materials in the Mediterranean, and eventually introduced a new local syllabic script in the 11th century BC which was in use until the 3rd century BC for the writing of ancient Greek and Cypriot language. The establishment of a Phoenician settlement at Kition on the southern coast in around 900 BC further pushed Cyprus’ trade as the Phoenicians were interested in the plentiful copper and wood resources for shipbuilding. With this, the Phoenician language was adopted, and foreign ideas such as the cult of the goddess Astarte were assimilated into Cypriot culture. However, despite such imported customs at the time, Cypriot art managed to maintain its native characteristics. Pottery of this period was generally produced from Proto-White Painted Ware, but the Cypriots also painted in black and red. Advancements in the political structure of society could be seen in the founding of ten kingdoms ruled by kings called wanaktes, as evidenced in a 7th century BC inscription.

Cypro-Archaic Period (c. 750 - c. 480 BC) 
Evidence revealing the surrender of the Cypriot rulers to Assyria in 709 BC was found on a stele at Kition, and the kingdoms remained under Assyrian rule until 669 BC. Prosperity and cultural incitement in the kingdoms followed, and the kings of Cyprus were able to self-rule as long as they paid frequent tribute to the king of Assyria. The riches and foreign relations of these Cypriot kings can be seen in evidence found in royal burial chambers at Salamis. In 669 BC, Cyprus became independent, a rare circumstance in Cypriot history that lasted until the country was subjugated by Egypt under Amasis II in 560 BC. During this time, the extent of Egyptian control was evident in the increasing use of Egyptian symbols in Cypriot art, such as the head of Hathor which was found commonly on art pieces from Amathus. It could also be seen in the many stone sculptures of male votaries. Cypriot sculpture in the Cypro-Archaic Period was characterised by polychrome decoration which was also used in Greece. Terracotta during this time was often painted, and the development of the mould meant that figurine production could be accelerated to a great extent. In 545 BC, Cyprus was conquered by Cyrus the Great of Persia, but allied with the Ionian Greeks in 499 BC in attempt to rebel against the Persian invaders. Undeterred by the fluctuations in power, Cyprus remained prosperous as a pivotal trade hub, and religious practices did not change with new rule.

Cypro-Classical Period (c. 480 - c. 310 BC) 
Until Cyprus was liberated by Alexander the Great in 333 BC, there was a constant power struggle for Cypriot independence against the Persians. During the Cypro-Classical era, sculptures, jewellery, clothing, and other art forms began to take on many Hellenic elements as a result of increased affiliation with the Greeks who aided the Cypriots in their attempts to depose the Persians. Sculptures in this period were generally made from terracotta or limestone and could only be afforded by the affluent. Although the influence of Greek culture was evident in the arts of Cyprus, the Cypriots still kept and used their own artistic styles. One prominent example is that of a Golgoi sarcophagus adorned with warriors in battle which is a scene commonly seen in Greek art. However, the Cypriot artist combines a hunting scene with this landscape, whereby the proportions of the animals are clearly distinctive from those found in Hellenic works. Similarly, Cypriot jewellery, in particular those made from gold, reveal a combination of both local and Greek artistic styles. East Greek influences from the sixth century BC gave rise to freestanding Cypriot sculptures that exhibited common Hellenic features such as the subtle smile and forward left foot.

Hellenistic and Roman Periods (c. 310 BC - c. 330 AD) 
Art in Cyprus eventually came to assimilate Hellenistic elements as the Ptolemies conquered the country in 300 BC. Although artistic elements of ancient Athens influenced Cypriot burial architecture and other art forms in the beginning, Egyptian styles ultimately superseded. After the Romans seized control in 58 BC, Cyprus once again became a vibrant trading centre. Eastern Mediterranean traders and artists, including sculptors, brought with them a range of foreign artistic practices as they entered the country. As marble and bronze sculptures were increasingly imported from the Aegean, traditional limestone sculptures started to diminish. Hellenistic elements were still prevalent in Cypriot sculpture, ceramics and jewellery during this time. Ultimately, all forms of Cypriot art became influenced by Roman techniques and styles.

Collections
Outside Cyprus, there are large collections in several museums, notably the British Museum and Louvre. One of the most extensive collections of ancient Cypriot art is The Cesnola Collection which is in the Metropolitan Museum of Art, New York. This inventory was amassed through personal investments and excavations by Luigi Palma di Cesnola who was an American consul based in Cyprus in 1865, before becoming the first director of the Metropolitan.

See also 
Pottery of ancient Cyprus
Ancient history of Cyprus

References 

Ancient Cyprus
Cyprus
Cyprus